= Gaelic Athletic Association league =

Gaelic Athletic Association league may refer to:

- National Football League
- National Hurling League
